Chekhovka is a rural locality (a selo) in Pogarsky District, Bryansk Oblast, Russia. The population was 473 as of 2010. There are 4 streets.

Geography 
Chekhovka is located 15 km northeast of Pogar (the district's administrative centre) by road. Glinki is the nearest rural locality.

References 

Rural localities in Pogarsky District